Grant Sorensen (born 27 March 1982) is an Australian retired volleyball player. He was part of the Australia men's national volleyball team at the 2002 FIVB Volleyball Men's World Championship in Japan. Two years later he played at the 2004 Summer Olympics in Athens. He was born in Ipswich, Queensland, Australia and his team played for Queensland Pirates. Sorensen ended his career in 2004.

Clubs
 Queensland Pirates, Brisbane (2002)

References

External links
 P rofile at Sports Reference

1982 births
Living people
Australian men's volleyball players
Olympic volleyball players of Australia
Volleyball players at the 2004 Summer Olympics